Meyrink, Meyerink, Meijerink, Meijering(h), and Meyerinck, are Germanic surnames. Most are toponymic surnames of Low Saxon origin, meaning "from the estate of the meier". People with a form of this surname include:

 Adriana Admiraal-Meijerink (1893–1992), Dutch fencer
 Albert Meijeringh (1645–1714), Dutch landscape painter
  (born 1992), German volleyball player
 Chiel Meijering (born 1954), Dutch composer
 Gustav Meyrink,  pseudonym of Gustav Meyer (1868 - 1932), Austrian author
 Hubert von Meyerinck (1896-1971), German actor
 Michelle Meyrink (1962-), Canadian actress
 Victoria Paige Meyerink (born 1960), American actress

Fictional characters:
 Luise Meyrink, fictional character in the video game series The King of Fighters

References

See also
Meyer (surname)
Meijer (surname)
Meiring, a surname